The Korchak culture is an archaeological culture of the sixth and seventh century East Slavs who settled along the southern tributaries of the Pripyat River and from the Dnieper River to the Southern Bug and Dniester rivers, throughout modern-day northwestern Ukraine and southern Belarus. 

It forms the eastern part of the so-called Prague-Korchak cultural horizon, a term used to encompass the   entirety of postulated early Slavic cultures from the Elbe to the Dniester, as opposed to the eastern Penkovka culture.

Archaeology
Excavations started in the 1920s by S. S. Gamchenko at the village of Korchak near Zhytomyr, Ukraine. The Korchak culture was identified as a distinct culture by lu. V. Kukharenko. Open settlements consisted of ten to twenty rectangular, semi-subterranean dwellings with a stone furnace placed in one corner. Each dwelling held up to five people, with less than 100 people per settlement. They performed cremation burial in kurgan burial mounds and in flat-grave cemeteries with cremations in urns. The culture is characterized by the specific shapes of modeled unadorned vessels, which represent the first stage in the development of Slavic pottery.

See also
List of Medieval Slavic tribes
Bug-Dniester culture
Carpathian Tumuli culture

References

 Kukharenko, Iu. V. “Slavianskie drevnosti V-IX vekov na territorii Pripiatskogo Poles’ia.” In the collection Kratkie soobshcheniia o dokladakh i polevykh issledovaniiakh Instituta istorii material’noi kul’tury, fasc. 57. Moscow, 1955.
 Petrov, V. P. “Pamiatniki korchakskogo tipa (po materialam raskopok S. S. Gamchenko).” In the collection . Moscow, 1963.
 Rusanova, I. P. Karta rasprostraneniia pamiatnikov tipa Korchak (VI–VII vekov novoi ery). Ibid., vol. 176. Moscow, 1970.
 Peter Heather, Empires and barbarians: the fall of Rome and the birth of Europe 

East Slavic history
Archaeological cultures of Eastern Europe
Early medieval archaeological cultures of Europe
Archaeological cultures in Belarus
Archaeological cultures in Ukraine
Slavic archaeological cultures